Bölükbaşı is a Turkish given name for males and a surname. The Albanian variant is Bylykbashi. Notable people with the surname include:

Surname 
 Bülent Bölükbaşı, Turkish footballer
 İbrahim Bölükbaşı (born 1990), Turkish wrestler
 Mehmet Bölükbaşı, Turkish footballer
 Osman Bölükbaşı, Turkish politician and political party leader
 Rıza Tevfik Bölükbaşı, Turkish philosopher, poet, politician and a community leader
 Cem Bölükbaşı, Turkish racing driver

See also
 Bölükbaşı, Military rank

Turkish-language surnames